Joshua Milne Cheetham, JP, MP (22 May 1835 – 27 November 1902) was a British Member of Parliament.

Cheetham was born in 1835 to James and Alice (née Greenwood) Cheetham of Crough House, Shaw and Crompton. Prior to his election to parliament, he ran the family firm James Cheetham and sons, cotton manufacturers, in Oldham, and was Chairman of the Oldham Joint Stock Bank and a justice of the peace for Lancashire.

After contesting Oldham constituency unsuccessfully in 1886, he again took part in the July 1892 general election and was elected to the House of Commons for the Oldham constituency. He was a Liberal, and favoured Home Rule for Ireland and the Gladstonian programme in general. He sat in the House of Commons until his retirement in 1895.

Cheetham married in 1862 Sarah Crompton, daughter of Abram Crompton.

He died of pneumonia at his home at Eyford Park, Gloucestershire, age 67.

See also
List of MPs elected in the 1892 United Kingdom general election

References

1835 births
1902 deaths
History of the Metropolitan Borough of Oldham
Liberal Party (UK) MPs for English constituencies
Politics of the Metropolitan Borough of Oldham
UK MPs 1892–1895
People from Shaw and Crompton